Angela N. Koehler is an American biochemist who is the Karl Van Tassel (1925) Career Development Professor of Chemical Biology at the Broad Institute. Her research considers the development of chemical tools to understand transcriptional regulation, and the design of next-generation pharmaceuticals.

Early life and education 
Koehler was an undergraduate student in biochemistry at Reed College. She worked on structural studies of proteins that recognize nucleic acids, including transfer RNA and DNA. She moved to Harvard University as a doctoral researcher, where she worked alongside Stuart Schreiber on strategies to understand the interactions between proteins and molecules.

Research and career 
Koehler joined the chemical biology program at the Broad Institute, where she was made group leader for chemical genetics. Koehler develops time-sensitive chemical tools to understand the dynamics of transcriptional regulation. Before the work of Koehler it was understood that transcription factors were "undraggable", as their inherent structural disorder compromised the binding of small-molecule ligands. Her research looks to develop small-molecule probes that modify proteins, which can, in turn, tune gene expression.

Koehler is on the faculty at the Koch Institute for Integrative Cancer Research. She has founded several companies, including Ligon Discovery, a drug discovery company focused on small-molecule microarrays, Kronos Bio, a cancer therapeutics accelerator and 76Bio, a biotechnology company that looks to develop targeted protein degraders.

Awards and honors 
 Genome Technology Young Investigator 
 Broad Institute Merkin Fellow 
 Novartis Lectureship in Chemistry
 Ono Pharma Breakthrough Science Award
 Fellow of the National Academy of Sciences
 National Science Foundation CAREER Award
 MIT Junior Bose Award for Excellence in Teaching

Selected publications

References 

Reed College alumni
Harvard Graduate School of Arts and Sciences alumni
Massachusetts Institute of Technology faculty
American women biochemists
Broad Institute people
Year of birth missing (living people)
Living people